In Mandaeism, Zahreil or Zahrʿil is the daughter of Qin, sister of Ruha, and mother of Ptahil. According to Book 5 of the Right Ginza, during Hibil Ziwa's descent to the World of Darkness (alma d-hšuka) or underworld, he marries Zahreil, who then gives birth to the creator of the material universe, Ptahil.

Zahreil is a lilith from the World of Darkness who dwells in the beds of pregnant women serving to ensure the wellbeing of the child before and after birth; E. S. Drower describes her as a genius of childbirth.

See also
Persephone

References

Demons in Mandaeism
Lilith